Gyas annulatus is a species of harvestmen in the family Sclerosomatidae from the Alps.

References

Harvestmen
Animals described in 1791